Joseph-Alfred Mongrain was a politician from Quebec, Canada.

Background

He was born on December 28, 1908, in St-Tite, Mauricie.  He was a public relations officer.

Mayor of Trois-Rivières

He was Mayor of Trois-Rivières from 1949 to 1953 and from 1960 to 1963.

Provincial politics

He ran as a Liberal candidate in 1952 in the district of Trois-Rivières against Premier Maurice Duplessis.  Duplessis was re-elected.

Member of Parliament

He ran as a Liberal candidate in 1953 in the district of Trois-Rivières and in 1958 in the district of Champlain.  Each time he lost.

He won as an Independent candidate in the district of Trois-Rivières in the 1965 federal election.  He was re-elected in 1968 as a Liberal.

Death

Mongrain died in office on December 23, 1970.

Footnotes

1908 births
1970 deaths
Liberal Party of Canada MPs
Mayors of Trois-Rivières
Members of the House of Commons of Canada from Quebec